A Cold Wind in August (1961) is a low-budget, independent romantic drama exploitation film directed by Alexander Singer and adapted from the eponymous novel by Burton Wohl.  The film stars Lola Albright as a mentally unbalanced burlesque show stripper in her 30s who becomes involved in a torrid romance with a 17-year-old boy played by Scott Marlowe. In reality, Marlowe was actually 28, only eight years Albright's junior.

Plot
Iris (Lola Albright), a woman with a background as a burlesque show stripper, is visited at her New York City apartment by her estranged husband. He requests that she star in an upcoming show in Newark, New Jersey for which he is obliged to supply performers. She resists the idea as she maintains her privacy by not working in shows local to the New York area.  However, her husband is desperately in need of assistance. While she has no romantic feelings for him, expressing puzzlement as to why she ever married him, she nonetheless is friendly with him and feels sorry for his predicament, so she agrees to consider it.

In the meantime, Iris meets Vito Perugino (Scott Marlowe), the 17-year-old son of the superintendent of the apartment building (Joe De Santis) and experiences an instant and powerful physical attraction to him. In their first meeting, she is shamelessly flirtatious; in their second, she completes her sexual seduction of him, marking the start of a passionate affair between the two. Iris unexpectedly finds herself experiencing an emotional attraction on top of her sexual one and a relationship she had originally intended to be brief turns serious. Vito asks Iris "to go steady" with him, and though she laughs a bit the teenager's use of that phrase to describe a committed relationship, she nonetheless happily accepts.

After Vito's immaturity brings turbulence into the relationship in the form of jealousy, Iris makes an attempt to pull away from him, but the attempt only serves to make her miserable.  She finds herself obsessed and wanting nothing but to return to him and resume a sexual and emotional satisfaction she's never experienced with any other man. She returns to Vito and they begin to patch their relationship, declaring their love for one another, but Vito is still unaware of her occupation, believing her to be a model or actress.

When Iris performs in the Newark burlesque show, one of Vito's friends sees her and informs Vito. He initially refuses to believe it, but he attends the next night's show and sees for himself. With his youth, Vito lacks the ability to cope with the destruction of his idealistic view of Iris, and an explosive, and even momentarily violent, argument ensues between the two.

After a week, Iris reaches out to Vito, hoping to make up with him by inviting him to her apartment for dinner. But upon his arrival, she quickly realizes that his interest in her has waned. While he had been sincere in his declarations of love for her, those feelings of "love" were just as prone to be fleeting as with any typical 17-year-old inexperienced in romantic relationships. Although he is no longer angry with Iris over her occupation, the discovery and subsequent argument have been enough so that even as his temper cooled, so did his passion for the relationship.

Continuing to be sincere in expressing his feelings for her, Vito acknowledges what Iris has sensed. He is truly sorry for the pain that it is causing her and tries his best to console her, telling her that he wishes the fight between them that changed his feelings had not happened. But beyond that, there is nothing else he can do. Lest Vito have any doubt, the devastated Iris assures him that her love for him was, and still is, genuine. With that, Vito leaves, on his way to a date with the new object of his romantic attention – a girl his own age – and Iris is left alone sobbing.

Cast
 Lola Albright as Iris Hartford
 Scott Marlowe as Vito Pellegrino
 Joe DeSantis as Papa Pellegrino
 Clark Gordon as Harry
 Janet Brandt as Shirley
 Skip Young as Al
 Ann Atmar as Carol
 Jana Taylor as Alice
 Dee Gee Green as Mary
 Herschel Bernardi as Juley Franz

Reception
Frank for its time in its depiction of the sexual relationship between Vito and Iris, A Cold Wind in August was made and marketed simply as a low-budget, exploitation movie. But unlike most entries in that genre, the film managed to find something of a positive critical following. It received positive reviews from the New York Herald Tribune, Variety and Saturday Review'''s Arthur Knight.  Robert Osborne has called it one of the best of all films exploring the theme of a May–December romance, echoing Lloyd Shearer's contemporary opinion that it was "probably the best treatment of a youth's affair with an older women Hollywood has ever produced".

More negative were The New York Times, asserting that the film "confused art for blatant sex", and Time, labeling it as a "nutty melodrama". While by no means offering universal praise for the movie, Pauline Kael called it "shrewdly conceived and well-acted" and, agreeing with a consistent theme in the film's positive reviews, offered high praise for Albright's performance. In 1985, even The New York Times, this time under the voice of a different critic, lauded Albright's acting in the film.

At the time of the film's making, Albright said that she thought it was her best role to that date.

Filmmaker John Waters has long touted A Cold Wind in August as one of his favorite films.

ReleaseA Cold Wind in August'' was released on July 26, 1961, in theatres. The film was released on DVD on March 29, 2011.

See also
 List of American films of 1961

References

External links 
 
 

1961 films
American coming-of-age drama films
1960s erotic drama films
American erotic romance films
American exploitation films
Films set in New York City
1961 romantic drama films
United Artists films
American romantic drama films
Films scored by Gerald Fried
American erotic drama films
1960s exploitation films
Films directed by Alexander Singer
1960s English-language films
1960s American films